The Nickelhütte Aue is a modern manufacturing site in East Germany for pure non-ferrous metals like nickel, copper, cobalt, molybdenum, vanadium and tungsten. It is descended from the historic Niederpfannenstiel Blue Colour Works, a paintworks that was founded in 1635 by Veit Hans Schnorr in Pfannenstiel near Aue.

Sources 

 Aue, Mosaiksteine der Geschichte, Hrsg. Stadtverwaltung Aue, Druckerei und Verlag Mike Rockstroh, Aue 1997; pages 49–66 Die Blaufarbenwerke sind Fabriken, die sonst nirgends in Sachsen als im Erzgebirge anzutreffen, und sind daher unserer Aufmerksamkeit würdig.
 Manfred Blechschmidt, Klaus Walther: Vom Blaufarbenwerk Niederpfannenstiel zum volkseigenen Betrieb Nickelhütte Aue – Episoden und Bilder aus 350 Jahren Geschichte. Lößnitz, Rockstroh, 1985
 Siegfried Sieber: Geschichte des Blaufarbenwerkes Niederpfannenstiel in Aue im Erzgebirge anläßlich seiner Dreihundertjahrfeier. Schwarzenberg, Glückauf-Verl., 1935
 Mike Haustein: Das Erbe des Blaufarbenwerks 1635–2010. Nickelhütte Aue, 2010  
 Ernst Ludwig Schubarth: Elemente der technischen Chemie, zum Gebrauch beim Unterricht im Königl. Gewerbinstitut und den Provinzial-Gewerbschulen; 2. Ausgabe 1835, A. Rücker, Hier: 14. Kapitel: S.151 ff - Smalte, Wismuth, Kobalt.

External links 
 Homepage for Nickelhütte Aue
 Das Magazin, Chemnitz mit einem Beitrag Historie der Nickelhütte Aue; 2006 (pdf file; 109 kB)
 Deutsche Fotothek: 55 photos of the Nickelhütte Aue factory. Under the tabl "Fotos" enter the keyword "Nickelhütte"

Companies based in Saxony
Ore Mountains
Mining in the Ore Mountains